Lines is an English surname. Notable people with the surname include:
Aaran Lines (born 1976), New Zealand association football player
Aaron Lines (born 1977), Canadian country musician
Andy Lines (born 1960), British Anglican bishop
Edwin Stevens Lines (1845-1927), Bishop of the Episcopal Diocese of Newark, New Jersey
Mary Lines (1893–1978), British athlete
Jonathan Lines, American politician
Oliver Lines (born 1995), English snooker player
Peter Lines (born 1969), English snooker player, father of Oliver
Roland Walter Lines (1877–1916), architect
Sue Lines (born 1953), Australian politician
Stanley Lines, Bermudian Olympic sprinter
Stewart Lines (born 1963), British racing driver

English-language surnames